Joseph E. Temple Fund Gold Medal (defunct) was a prestigious art prize awarded by the Pennsylvania Academy of the Fine Arts most years from 1883 to 1968. A Temple Medal recognized the best oil painting by an American artist shown in PAFA's annual exhibition. Recipients included James Whistler, John Singer Sargent, Winslow Homer, Thomas Eakins, Robert Henri and Edward Hopper.

History
The medal was named for Philadelphia merchant Joseph E. Temple (1811–1880), a patron of the arts and PAFA Board member, whose bequest of $51,000 funded the awards.

Any American artist was welcome to submit works for PAFA's annual exhibitions. Juries in painting and sculpture, composed of PAFA faculty and invited artists, evaluated hundreds (and later thousands) of submissions and chose those for exhibition. The Painters' Jury of Selection also chose the medal winners in painting. An artist could be awarded a Temple medal only once. Sometimes the medal-winning painting was purchased for PAFA's permanent collection.

The process for the first Temple Medal was a fiasco. To encourage American historical painting, PAFA added a $3,000 cash bonus to the 1883 gold medal if it went to a historical work. But the art jury could not agree on a gold medal recipient. A silver medal would have been awarded to William B. T. Trego for The March to Valley Forge, but he refused to accept it. Trego argued that if only one Temple medal was awarded it should be a gold, not a silver (which implied second place). Trego sued PAFA to be named the gold medal winner and claim the cash bonus. After losing in a Philadelphia court, he took his appeal to the Pennsylvania Supreme Court, which concurred with the lower court's ruling that PAFA's art jury had the right to issue awards as it saw fit. After 1883, no cash prizes accompanied Temple medals.

From 1884 to 1889, a gold medal was awarded for the best figure painting and a silver medal for the best landscape or marine painting. But the jury ignored the rules in 1890, awarding a landscape-with-cattle painting the gold medal. In 1891 and 1892, a gold medal was awarded for the best painting regardless of subject, and a silver for the second-best. No second-place medals were awarded after 1892. From 1893 to 1899, two gold medals were awarded each year. Beginning in 1900, a single gold medal was awarded for the best painting in PAFA's annual exhibition regardless of subject.

Famously, Thomas Eakins, who had been forced to resign as director of PAFA's school in 1886, accepted his 1904 award for Archbishop William Henry Elder by declaring, ”I think you’ve got a heap of impudence to give me a medal." He then rode off on a bicycle to the Philadelphia Mint, where he sold the gold medal for its melt-down value.

William Glackens wryly changed the name of the figure painting that won him the 1924 award from Nude to Temple Gold Medal Nude.

By the 1930s, PAFA's annual exhibitions had acquired a reputation for being parochial and nepotistic. With the costs of transporting and insuring the works, they were also expensive. Beginning in 1954, PAFA's exhibitions became bi-annual. The last Temple Gold Medal was awarded to Helen Frankenthaler in 1968. Beginning in 1969, PAFA's annual exhibitions were dedicated exclusively to student work from its school.

List of recipients

See also
 Beck Gold Medal
 Mary Smith Prize
 Widener Gold Medal

Notes

References

Temple
American visual arts awards
Awards established in 1883
Awards disestablished in 1968
Lists of American artists